Sir Robert Mafeking Macfarlane  (né Haynes, 17 May 1900 – 2 December 1981) was a New Zealand politician of the Labour Party. He was a Member of Parliament, served as Speaker of the House of Representatives and was a Mayor of Christchurch.

Early life
Macfarlane was born in Christchurch on 17 May 1900, the son of Emma Rose King Haynes. Born during the Second Boer War, his mother gave him the middle name Mafeking from a town in South Africa that was under siege at the time of his birth. In 1904, he took the surname Macfarlane after his mother married Hugh Macfarlane, a labourer.

He married Louisa Jacobs in 1932 with whom he had two daughters.

Local body politics
Macfarlane was on the Christchurch City Council (1927–1929, 1936–1941, 1947–1959, and 1961–1981), and was Mayor of Christchurch twice, from 1938 to 1941 and from 1950 to 1958. He was at various times a member of the Lyttelton Harbour Board.

Member of Parliament 

Macfarlane entered Parliament in 1939 following a by-election, replacing Ted Howard (although Howard's daughter Mabel Howard had hoped to replace him following his death). He was the Member of Parliament for Christchurch South from 1939 to 1946, then for Christchurch Central from 1946 to 1969, when he retired.

From May 1947 until September 1947 he was the Labour Party's junior whip. He was subsequently Labour's senior whip from September 1947 until June 1951.

Speaker of the House of Representatives
He was the 14th Speaker of the House of Representatives during the Second Labour Government (1957–60). As the government held a working majority of one careful management was needed in the house to avoid the government losing a division. Macfarlane at times struggled with his hearing, which was known to be poor, which was further impeded when wearing the formal wig inside the chamber. Many MPs, particularly Keith Holyoake the Leader of the Opposition, would take advantage of this and would challenge, ignore and defy his rulings. Regardless a vote was never lost and later Labour leader Bill Rowling credited Macfarlane's use of 'common sense rather than the rule book' with enabling the government to survive its full term in office.

Macfarlane was given the job of speaker after failing to be elected to cabinet. He had wanted to be Minister of Internal Affairs.

Under Arnold Nordmeyer, and more particularly, Norman Kirk Labour wanted to modernise itself and Macfarlane was among several MPs who became increasingly pressured to retire. In defiance of this he was re-nominated again by local members for the 1966 general election, his nomination was queried by head office. He was allowed to stand again on the stipulation that he would not stand at the 1969 general election.

Honours
In the 1954 Queen's Birthday Honours, Macfarlane was appointed a Companion of the Order of St Michael and St George, and in the 1974 New Year Honours he was elevated to Knight Commander of the same order. In the 1985 New Year Honours, his wife, Louisa, Lady Macfarlane, was appointed a Companion of the Queen's Service Order for community service.

Military service
In World War II he served in the Middle East in the ASC of the 2nd New Zealand Expeditionary Force for 2½ years.

Notes

References

 Who's Who in New Zealand, 10th Edition 1971

External links
Biography with photo at Trade Union website
 

|-

|-

|-

|-

|-

1900 births
1982 deaths
Mayors of Christchurch
New Zealand Labour Party MPs
New Zealand military personnel of World War II
Speakers of the New Zealand House of Representatives
New Zealand MPs for Christchurch electorates
Burials at Ruru Lawn Cemetery
Members of the New Zealand House of Representatives
Christchurch City Councillors
Deputy mayors of Christchurch
Unsuccessful candidates in the 1938 New Zealand general election
Unsuccessful candidates in the 1935 New Zealand general election
New Zealand Knights Commander of the Order of St Michael and St George
New Zealand politicians awarded knighthoods
Lyttelton Harbour Board members